The  is a suspension bridge which links the city of Kobe on the Japanese island of Honshu to Iwaya on Awaji Island. It is part of the Kobe-Awaji-Naruto Expressway, and crosses the busy and turbulent Akashi Strait (Akashi Kaikyō in Japanese). Currently, it is only the second-longest, behind the 1915 Çanakkale Bridge that was opened in March 2022.

It is one of the key links of the Honshū–Shikoku Bridge Project, which created three routes across the Inland Sea.

History

Background

The Akashi Kaikyo Bridge forms part of the Kobe-Awaji-Naruto Expressway, the easternmost route of the bridge system linking the islands of Honshu and Shikoku. The bridge crosses the Akashi Strait (width 4 km) between Kobe on Honshu and Iwaya on Awaji Island; the other major part of the crossing is completed by the Ōnaruto Bridge, which links Awaji Island to Ōge Island across the Naruto Strait.

Before the Akashi Kaikyo Bridge was built, ferries carried passengers across the Akashi Strait. A  major passageway for shipping, it is also known for its gale, heavy rain, storms, and natural disasters. The  in 1945, which killed 304 people, first stirred public discussion on the possibility of a bridge over the span. In 1955, two ferries sank in the Shiun Maru disaster during a storm, killing 168 people. The ensuing shock and public outrage convinced the Japanese government to develop plans for a bridge to cross the strait.

Investigations

Investigations for a bridge across the strait were first conducted by the Kobe municipal government in 1957, followed by an evaluation by the national Ministry of Construction in 1959. In 1961, the Ministry of Construction and Japan National Railways jointly commissioned the Japan Society of Civil Engineers (JSCE) to conduct a technical study, and the JSCE established a committee to investigate five potential routes between Honshu and Shikoku. In 1967, the committee compiled the results of the technical study, concluding that a bridge across the Akashi Strait would face "extremely severe design and construction conditions, which have no similar examples in the world's long-span bridges" and recommending additional study.

In response to the report, the Honshu–Shikoku Bridge Authority (now the Honshu-Shikoku Bridge Expressway Company) was established in 1970, which conducted extensive investigations, including sea trials to establish the construction method of a submarine foundation. In 1973, a bridge with a central span of 1,780 meters on the route was approved, but construction was halted due to poor economic conditions.

Construction

The original plan called for a mixed railway-road bridge, but when construction on the bridge began in April 1988, the construction was restricted to road only, with six lanes. Actual construction did not begin until May 1988 and involved more than 100 contractors. The Great Hanshin Earthquake in January 1995 did not do substantial damage to the bridge due to anti-seismic building methods. Construction was finished on time in September 1996. The bridge was opened for traffic on April 5, 1998, in a ceremony officiated by the then-Crown Prince Naruhito and his spouse Crown Princess Masako of Japan along with Construction Minister Tsutomu Kawara.

Structure

Substructures 
The bridge has four substructures: two main piers (located beneath the water) and two anchorages (on land). These are denoted 1A, 2P, 3P, and 4A in sequence from the Kobe side. 1A consists of an underground circular retaining wall filled with roller-compacted concrete, 2P and 3P are circular underwater spread-foundation caisson structures, and 4A is a rectangular direct foundation. 2P is located at the edge of the sea plateau at a level depth of 40–50 m and a bearing depth of 60 m, and 3P is located at the symmetrical point to 2P with respect to the bridge's center, at a level depth of 36–39 m and a bearing depth of 57 m.

The towers are located in an area of strong tidal currents where water velocity exceeds 7 knots (about 3.6 m/s). The selected scour protection measure includes the installation of a filtering layer with a thickness of 2 m in a range of 10 m around the caisson, covered with rip raps of 8 m thick.

Superstructures

The bridge has three spans. The central span was required to be greater than 1,500 m to accommodate maritime traffic; it was concluded before construction began that a larger span between 1950 and 2050 meters would minimize construction costs.

The bridge also contains tuned mass dampers that are designed to operate at the resonance frequency of the bridge to dampen forces. Each anchorage required  of concrete.

The Akashi–Kaikyo bridge has a total of 1,737 illumination lights: 1,084 for the main cables, 116 for the main towers, 405 for the girders and 132 for the anchorages. Sets of three high-intensity discharge lamps in the colors red, green and blue are mounted on the main cables. The RGB color model and computer technology make for a variety of combinations. Twenty-eight patterns are used for occasions such as national or regional holidays, memorial days or festivities.

Cost
The total cost is estimated at ¥500 billion or US$3.6 billion (per 1998 exchange rates). It is expected to be repaid by charging drivers a toll to cross the bridge. The toll is 2,300 yen and the bridge is used by approximately 23,000 cars per day.

See also 
 Rainbow Bridge (Tokyo)

References

External links

 Akashi Kaikyo Bridge at Structurae

1998 in Japan
Articles containing video clips
Bridges completed in 1998
Buildings and structures in Hyōgo Prefecture
Suspension bridges in Japan
Toll bridges in Japan
Tourist attractions in Hyōgo Prefecture